John "Johnnie" Baxter ( – 7 January 1927) was an English professional rugby league footballer who played in the 1900s.

Playing career

International honours
Baxter won a cap for England while at Rochdale Hornets in 1904 against Other Nationalities, and won a cap for Great Britain while at Rochdale Hornets in 1908 against New Zealand.

County honours
Baxter represented Lancashire while at Rochdale Hornets.

County Cup Final appearances
Baxter played  in Rochdale Hornets' 12–5 victory over Oldham in the 1911–12 Lancashire County Cup Final during the 1911–12 season at Wheater's Field, Broughton, Salford on Saturday 2 December 1911, in front of a crowd of 20,000.

Club career
Baxter made his début for Rochdale Hornets against Salford at Athletic Grounds, Rochdale on Saturday 14 December 1901.

References

External links

1880s births
1927 deaths
England national rugby league team players
English rugby league players
Great Britain national rugby league team players
Lancashire rugby league team players
People from Dalton-in-Furness
Rugby league players from Cumbria
Place of birth missing
Rochdale Hornets players
Rugby league five-eighths
Rugby league fullbacks
Rugby league halfbacks
Rugby league players from Barrow-in-Furness